Listed below are the dates and results for the 1974 FIFA World Cup qualification rounds for the South American Zone (CONMEBOL). For an overview of the qualification rounds, see the article 1974 FIFA World Cup qualification.

The 9 teams were divided into 3 groups of 3 teams each. 2.5 spots were open for competition, as Brazil qualified automatically as holders. The teams would play against each other on a home-and-away basis. The winners of Groups 1 and 2 would qualify, while the winner of Group 3 would advance to the UEFA / CONMEBOL Intercontinental Play-off.

Group 1

 

 

 

 

 

Uruguay qualified on goal difference.

Group 2

 

 

 

 

 

Argentina qualified.

Group 3

 

Chile and Peru finished level on points and goal difference, and a play-off on neutral ground was played to decide who would advance to the UEFA / CONMEBOL Intercontinental Play-off.

Chile advanced to the UEFA–CONMEBOL intercontinental play-off.

Inter-confederation play-offs

Chile advanced by walkover to the 1974 FIFA World Cup.

Qualified teams
The following four teams from CONMEBOL qualified for the final tournament.

1 Bold indicates champions for that year. Italic indicates hosts for that year.

Goalscorers

5 goals

 Rubén Ayala

3 goals

 Willington Ortiz
 Fernando Morena

2 goals

 Miguel Ángel Brindisi
 Washington Muñoz
 Adalberto Escobar
 Saturnino Arrúa
 Jorge Insfran
 Hugo Sotil
 Luis Cubilla

1 goal

 Oscar Fornari
 Carlos Guerini
 Raúl Morales
 Sergio Ahumada
 Julio Crisosto
 Rogelio Farias
 Francisco Valdés
 Ítalo Estupiñán
 Pedro Alcides Bareiro
 Juvencio Osorio
 Héctor Bailetti
 Denís Milar

Notes

CONMEBOL
FIFA World Cup qualification (CONMEBOL)
World